The Lumières Award for Most Promising Actress is an annual award presented by the Académie des Lumières since 2000.

Winners and nominees
Winners are listed first with a blue background, followed by the other nominees.

2000s

2010s

2020s

See also
César Award for Most Promising Actress

External links 
 Lumières Award for Most Promising Actress at AlloCiné

Promising Actress

Awards for young actors
Awards established in 2000
2000 establishments in France